Kingsley Ikeke (born February 25, 1973) is a US-based Nigerian  professional boxer who competed from 1995 to 2010. He lost to Anthony Hanshaw on points, KOd Antwun Echols but was KOd by Armenia's Arthur Abraham in the fifth round for the vacant IBF middleweight title. Later he lost to Jean Pascal.

Professional boxing record

References

External links 

Kingsley Ikeke Returns to Action on ESPN2’s Friday Night Fights
Abraham stops Ikeke to win IBF middleweight title

1973 births
Living people
Nigerian male boxers
Super-middleweight boxers
People from Benin City